The Viareggio derailment was the derailment of a freight train and subsequent fire which occurred on 29 June 2009 in a railway station in Viareggio, Lucca, a city in Central Italy's Tuscany region. Thirty-two people were killed and a further twenty-six were injured.

Details 

Freight train No. 50325 from Trecate to Gricignano-Teverola, hauled by Class E655 locomotive E 655 175 with 14 tank wagons was derailed at Viareggio at 23:48 local time (21:48 UTC) on 29 June 2009. Of the 14 wagons, the first wagon was registered by Polskie Koleje Państwowe, the other 13 wagons by Deutsche Bahn (DB). The first DB-registered wagon, No. 338078182106, which was owned by GATX Rail Austria GmbH derailed on plain track in Viareggio station. The wagon hit the platform of the station and overturned to the left. The next four wagons also overturned and the two following were derailed but remained upright. The last seven wagons were not derailed, remaining intact on the track. The derailed wagons crashed into houses alongside the railway line.

Some of the wagons were owned by KVG Kesselwagen, a division of GATX, and leased to ExxonMobil and ERG (the owners of the oil refinery where the train left), were reported to have been carrying Liquefied Petroleum Gas (LPG). Two of these exploded and caught fire. Seven people were reported to have been killed when a house collapsed. An eighth person who was killed was reported to have been riding a scooter on a road adjoining the railway. A child was found carbonised in a car in front of the house where he lived with his parents. It is speculated that his parents put him in the car to save him and then returned to the house to save other two children.

The two members of the train crew suffered minor injuries in the accident. A large area of Viareggio was damaged in the subsequent fires caused by the wagons carrying LPG self-combusting. Twenty-six people were reported to have been injured in the accident. The accident is the worst rail accident in Italy since the collision between two trains in Murazze di Vado near Bologna on 15 April 1978, which killed 48 people. It was reported that a whole street had been destroyed in the explosion and fire.

Aftermath 
A state of emergency was declared by local authorities. Around 1,000 residents of Viareggio were evacuated from their homes as a result of the accident. Italian Prime Minister Silvio Berlusconi visited Viareggio "to take control of the situation", but he received boos and cries of "go home". Dr. Enrico Petri, an eyewitness and local hospital physician, said that 36 people had been taken to Versilia Hospital in Viareggio suffering from 80–90% burns. He compared the aftermath to a terrorist attack. The accident left around 100 people homeless. The accident resulted in the disruption of rail services between Rome and Genoa. Viareggio railway station was partially reopened on 3 July 2009.

Cause 
The Direzione Generale per le Investigazioni Ferroviarie, a section of the Italian Minister of Infrastructure and Transport opened an investigation into the cause of the accident. Italian police said that the accident may have been caused by damaged tracks or a problem with the brakes on the train. Italian union CGIL is reported to have blamed the decrepit state of the rolling stock; the maintenance of the wagon was the responsibility of GATX. The failure of an axle on the wagon that derailed is being investigated as a possible cause. 
Pending the official conclusions of the commissions of inquiry the probable cause of the accident is attributable to structural failure of an axle of the carriage of the first tank wagon derailed. Italian Transport Minister Altero Matteoli informed the Italian Parliament on 1 July that a defective axle may have caused the accident.

On 29 July 2009, an Extraordinary Network Meeting of the Network of National Safety Authorities was held. It invited members to disseminate information related to problems related to Type A Axles to railway operators, owners and keepers of freight wagons.

Prosecution
In 2017, the Court of Lucca tried thirty-three people in connection with the derailment. The first instance trial ended with ten accused acquitted and the conviction of the others, including the former Rete Ferroviaria Italiana (RFI) CEOs Mauro Moretti and Michele Mario Elia. Moretti was sentenced to seven years in prison for his role as CEO of RFI (2001-2006) but acquitted as CEO of Ferrovie dello Stato Italiane (FS) (2006-2014), while Elia was sentenced to seven and a half years. However, the Court of Lucca imposed the highest penalties (from six to eight years) on the defendants of the companies Gatx Rail and Jungenthal, responsible for the mechanical problems that caused the accident.

The first instance ruling was partially confirmed by the Florence Court of Appeal with the ruling of 20 June 2019, which also ordered the acquittal of further positions referable to the RFI Company and confirmed the acquittal of Ferrovie dello Stato and FS Logistics from administrative responsibility. During 2020, all the convicts filed an appeal with the Supreme Court.

With sentence of 8 January 2021, the Supreme Court confirmed the criminal responsibility for the crime of culpable railway disaster of 11 people (of which 9 belonging - at the time of the facts - to the companies responsible for maintenance activities / revision, Gatx Rail Germany, Gatx Rail Austria, Jungenthal, Cima Riparazioni; one belonging to Trenitalia and one to FS Logistica); the Court also annulled the sentence pronounced by the Court of Appeal against the positions of the former CEOs of RFI (Michele Mario Elia and Mauro Moretti, the latter also former CEO of Ferrovie dello Stato) and 3 other people, deferring all to a new appeal judgment. Upon the outcome of the Supreme Court judgment, all the companies originally blamed for administrative liability were definitively acquitted.

See also 

 Lac-Mégantic rail disaster – a 2013 derailment of crude oil train and subsequent fire and explosions in the core of a Canadian town with 42 killed and another 5 presumed dead.
 Nishapur train disaster – a 2004 derailment of a runaway fuel and flammable goods train in Iran, the resulting fire and explosion killed around 300 people.
 Soham rail disaster – a 1944 fire and subsequent explosion of an ammunition train near Soham, England.
 Expansion ratio
 Moby Prince disaster

References

External links 

 Mobile phone footage of the fire

Viareggio derailment
Train derailment (2009)
Viareggio
Viareggio
Viareggio
Explosions in 2009
Fires in Italy
Accidents and incidents involving Ferrovie dello Stato Italiane
Gas explosions
June 2009 events in Europe
Train and rapid transit fires
2009 disasters in Italy